A. W. Buck House is a historic home located at Ebensburg, Cambria County, Pennsylvania.  It was built in 1889, and is a high style Queen Anne style dwelling.  A two-story wing with end tower was built in 1903.  It is a -story, three-bay brick building.  It features an eight sided, three-story tower and a wrap-around porch.  It was originally built as a private residence.  In 1923, it was purchased by the Roman Catholic Diocese of Altoona-Johnstown as a convent for the Sisters of St. Joseph.

In 1990, it was sold to the Cambria County Historical Society and is operated as a local history museum.

It was added to the National Register of Historic Places in 1995.

References

External links
Cambria County Historical Society

1889 establishments in Pennsylvania
History museums in Pennsylvania
Houses completed in 1889
Houses in Cambria County, Pennsylvania
Houses on the National Register of Historic Places in Pennsylvania
Museums in Cambria County, Pennsylvania
Queen Anne architecture in Pennsylvania
National Register of Historic Places in Cambria County, Pennsylvania